Yad La-Shiryon (officially: The Armored Corps Memorial Site and Museum at Latrun) is Israel's official memorial site for fallen soldiers from the armored corps, as well as one of the most diverse tank museums in the world.

The site was created through the initiative of veteran officers of the armored corps. The outdoor display includes 110 tanks and other armored fighting vehicles, both Israeli and captured enemy examples including the Merkava and T-34, T-54, T-55, T-62  tanks, as well as vehicles obtained or purchased from allied nations specifically for diversifying the collection like the German Leopard tank or the only T-72 on display in Israel. Other notable items include: an M4 Sherman tank mounted high atop a former British water tower; a collection of mobile bridges constructed by the IDF (Israeli Defense Forces) which can be carried by tanks and erected while under fire; captured enemy vehicles, most of which Israel has modified and updated; a tank with a blown up gun; and a long, engraved commemorative wall bearing the names of Armored Corps soldiers killed in defense of the country.

Memorial site
The main building, a Mandate-era Tegart fortress, houses a library with a publicly accessible computerized record of every fallen Israeli tank soldier, and a synagogue. The deeply pocked outer walls of the fort are a reminder of the building's wartime past and its use by the Arab Legion. The tower of the fortress has been converted into a Tower of Tears by Israeli artist, Danny Karavan. The inside of the tower is covered by steel taken from a tank and water circulating from a pool underneath the installation trickles down the walls.

The museum also features a large amphitheater, an auditorium, and has photos, poetry, paintings and cartoons on display. Screenings are held regularly, showing both historical film footage and more recent tributes to Israelis injured and fallen.

The Wall of Names, erected outside, displays the names of all the soldiers from the Armored Corps killed in the 1948 Arab-Israeli War and later wars.

Tank on the tower

The most famous sight at Yad La-Shiryon is most likely that of a tank on top of a tower, which serves as the museum's logo. In 1979, by decision of late Major General (Ret.) Moshe Peled, the tank was hoisted on top of a tower on the site, which was originally used as a water tower. The tank that was chosen is an American M4 Sherman, one of the first tanks that fought in the service of the Israel Defense Forces. Since the water tower was only designed to support 25 tons and the tank weighed 34 tons, both the engine and transmission gears had to be removed.

Tank collection
Yad La-shiryon is famous worldwide for its unique and diverse collection of tanks and armored vehicles. There are over a hundred different vehicles in the collection.

Some of the tanks and military vehicles included are:

Israeli

 Merkava mark I, II, III, IV and Namer
 Nimda Shoet
 Nodedet
 "Timsach" (Gillois amphibious tank-carrier)

American
 Diamond T truck
 M24 Chaffee
 M42 Duster
 M3 Lee
 M3 Grant
 M3 Scout Car
 M3A1 Stuart
 M5A1 Stuart
 M41 Walker Bulldog
 M107 Self-Propelled Gun
 M113 Armored Personnel Carrier
 M901 ITV
 M551 Sheridan
 M578 Light Recovery Vehicle
 several variations of the M4 Sherman, including:
 Ambutank (Sherman Medical Evacuation Tank)
 Eyal observation post vehicle
 M4 Dozer
 M4A4 with FL-10 Turret (Egyptian variant)
 M50 and M51 Super Sherman (Israeli Variant)
 MAR-240
 MAR-290
 Sherman Crab
M10 tank destroyer
 Several variations of the Patton tank including:
 M48 Patton
 M60 Patton
 Several variations of Magach - improved Israeli versions of the M48 and the M60
 Several variations of US halftracks
 Willys MB jeep

British
 17pdr SP Achilles
 Alvis Saladin
 Archer (tank destroyer)
 Cromwell tank
 FV 4101 Charioteer
 FV 4201 Chieftain
 Matilda tank
 Several variations of Centurion tank, including:
 Centurion Mk 5
 Bridgelayer
 Centurion BARV
 Puma
 Sho't
 Ferret armoured car
 Light Tank Mk VI (Vickers)
 Marmon-Herrington Armoured Car
 Scammell Contractor

French
 AMX-13
 AMX-VCI
 Hotchkiss H35
 Panhard AML
 Renault R35

German
 StuG III
 Panzer IV
 Leopard tank

Soviet
 BTR-40
 BTR-50
 Improvised medevac version of BTR-50
 BTR-60
 BTR-152
 Improvised recovery version of BTR-152
 Several variations of BRDM-2
 IS-3
 ISU-152
 Recovery version of ISU-152
 ISU-152 with gun removed, labeled as command vehicle
 PT-76
 T-34-85
 T-34/100 or T-100 tank destroyer
 Several variations of T-54/T-55 tanks, including:
 IDF Achzarit
 Tiran-4 - upgraded T-54
 Tiran-5 - upgraded T-55
 T-62 (Israeli Tiran 6)
 T-72 (a machine from former East German Nationale Volksarmee)
 ZSU-23-4
 ZSU-57-2

Allied Forces Monument

A monument was constructed as a tribute to the Allies of World War II, led by the United States, Great Britain and The Soviet Union. The monument is composed of a rock pile, on top of which the three main battle tanks that served in the armies of the Allied Forces on different fronts: a British Cromwell, an American Sherman, and the Soviet T-34. The monument is surrounded by the flags of 19 countries and organizations that actively participated in the struggle, including the flag of the Jewish Brigade, which fought within the ranks of the British army. 
It is being reconstructed as of December 2011.

Museum of Armored Corps History
The museum includes several exhibits dedicated to the history of armored combat in general, including:
 Model room with dozens of tanks
 Full-scale models of:
 An armored knight
 Assyrian and Egyptian chariots
 Leonardo da Vinci's sketches of a proposed armed vehicle
 Stamp collection, featuring tanks and other armored vehicles

Other features
The site also has a large outdoor theater where various ceremonies and performances take place, as it is one of the largest theaters in the country and centrally located. There is also a birdwatching facility equipped with a radar to track migratory birds.

Other tank museums 
Deutsches Panzermuseum — Germany
Holy Defense Museum — Iran
Kubinka Tank Museum — Russia
Musée des Blindés — France
Patton Museum of Cavalry and Armor — United States
The Tank Museum — United Kingdom
Royal Tank Museum —  Jordan
Wehrtechnische Studiensammlung — Germany
American Heritage Museum — United States
Polish Army Museum – large collection of Soviet, western and Polish AFVs
Park vojaške zgodovine Pivka - Slovenia, large collection of US, USSR and Yugoslav armour and other army equipment (including a submarine)

References

External links

  
Yad Lashiryon (Armoured Corps) Museum
Wehrtechnsiche Studiensammlung (Museum der Bundeswehr in Koblenz)

Tank museums
Military and war museums in Israel
Buildings and structures in the West Bank
Museums established in 1982
1982 establishments in Israel
Birdwatching sites